James Nettle Glover (March 15, 1838 – November 18, 1921) was a politician, banker, and the founder (as well as its second mayor) of the city of Spokane. In 1871 two squatters, James Downing and Seth Scranton, had built a sawmill at the south bank of the Spokane Falls on the Spokane River. Later Glover would become one of Spokane's first bankers and mayor.

External links
City of Spokane – History – Timeline at www.spokanecity.org  
City-County of Spokane Historic Preservation at www.historicspokane.org

Mayors of Spokane, Washington
1837 births
1921 deaths
History of Spokane, Washington